Several Texas Tech University alumni have competed in the Olympic Games.

Atlanta 1996
Sheryl Swoopes

Sydney 2000
Sheryl Swoopes

Athens 2004
Jonathan Johnson
Sheryl Swoopes

Beijing 2008
Shereefa Lloyd 
Michael Mathieu 
Andrae Williams

References

Texas Tech
Olympians
Texas Tech
Olympians
Texas Tech
Texas Tech University Olympians
Texas Tech University Olympians